Fernandes Guitars is a Japanese guitar and accessory manufacturer. It originated in 1969 as a builder of flamenco guitars. As the company grew, it expanded production to include electric guitars, bass guitars, amplifiers, and accessories to become one of the biggest guitar manufacturers in Japan. Fernandes also owns the Burny brand of Gibson guitar replicas.

Overview 

Despite its high production figures, Fernandes is better known in the United States for its Sustainer system, which uses electromagnetism to vibrate a string for an extended period, so long as the user continues to fret a note. Unlike the similar manual EBow sustainer, the Fernandes Sustainer can be used with a standard plectrum, because the sustainer is embedded in the body of guitar. Fernandes' custom shop has installed numerous Sustainers into guitars built by other manufacturers.

Fernandes continues to manufacture guitars that cover the range from inexpensive starter models to custom instruments. In 2000, Fernandes made a guitar to promote the video game Um Jammer Lammy, similar to Lammy's guitars.

Musicians using Fernandes 

 Robert Trujillo of Metallica has been seen using a variety of Fernandes basses, mainly 5-string neck-thru types appearing to be based on the "Gravity Deluxe" production model. Allegedly, Rob's personally owned Fernandes basses were custom made by either the Fernandes North Hollywood and/or Japanese custom shops. The specifications and complete history of Rob's personally owned and stage-played Fernandes basses by most accounts is still a mystery.
 Brad Gillis of American rock band Night Ranger and former Ozzy Osbourne guitarist had his own Stratocaster-type model that was red with a black pick guard. Gillis still uses his Fernandes guitar as his main guitar when he performs in concert with Night Ranger.    
 Billie Joe Armstrong of American punk rock band Green Day had a Fernandes The Revival RST-50 Stratocaster since he was 10 named "Blue" from his mother, and has played it live for nearly every show he has played, near exclusively used for all songs in Eb tuning.
 The Edge of U2 has started using a Retro Rocket and Native Pro guitar with Sustainer to play With or Without You when playing live.
 Heath of Japanese heavy metal band X Japan uses his signature Fernandes model FJB-115H bass guitar almost exclusively. Previously he used several Burny guitars, including his signature model DB-85H.
 hide of Japanese heavy metal band X Japan used Fernandes guitars almost exclusively. He has numerous signature models with the company.
 Hidehiko Hoshino of Japanese rock band Buck-Tick uses Fernandes guitars almost exclusively. He has had several signature models with the company.
 Hisashi Imai of Japanese rock band Buck-Tick uses Fernandes guitars almost exclusively. He has several signature models with the company.
 Tomoyasu Hotei of Boøwy and solo fame was one of the leading Japanese artists to front Fernandes in the mid-80s onwards, launching several versions of the TEJ model guitar. 
 You of Japanese hard rock band Dead End has his own signature model with Fernandes.
 Steve Hackett, formerly of Genesis and GTR, has used Burny guitars with sustainer units (one black and one gold) since his 1999 Darktown album. They have since replaced his previous stock Les Paul guitars as his electric guitar of choice for every album and live show since then.
 Tony Campos of Fear Factory, Asesino, formally of Static-X and Soulfly, has his own signature model Tremor 5 Deluxe and Tremor 5X.
 Dave Kushner of Velvet Revolver, Wasted Youth, and DKFXP uses Fernandes Ravelle Signature guitar.
 Kasper Eistrup of Kashmir, Danish Band, has used a Fernandes Telecaster with a Fernandes Sustainer kit for several years, and has since acquired another black Fernandes Telecaster, as well.
 Tobias Forge of Ghost.
 Kirk Hammett of Metallica used a Fernandes Stratocaster, seemingly an EMG equipped FST-135 nicknamed "Edna", for clean parts on some of the early Metallica albums such as Ride the Lightning as well as live on early tours. He also used a customized red 1985 FST-65 with a CS Style 22F wood neck option. 
 Kurt Cobain of American grunge rock group Nirvana used a Fernandes Stratocaster neck on a Fender body during their live performance at the Paramount
 Neal Schon of Journey used the sustainer system in Fernandes guitars, Aria Pro II guitars, and eventually in his black Les Paul (replacing the neck P90), as well as his own production models. Many of his famous leads, such as "Send Her My Love", are examples of the sustainer system's abilities.
 John Flansburgh of They Might Be Giants used a Fernandes The Revival RST-50 Stratocaster for most of the songs on Lincoln, and on the band's January 28, 1987 performance at the Lone Star in Kansas City, Missouri.

References

External links

 Official website

Guitar manufacturing companies
Electric bass guitars by manufacturer
Musical instrument manufacturing companies of Japan
Manufacturing companies based in Osaka